Vice Ganda is a Filipino comedian, actor, reality show judge, television host, and recording artist.

Viceral appeared in several television series and sitcoms such as Dyosa, under the direction of Wenn V. Deramas. Vice also had another supporting role in the drama series Maging Sino Ka Man: Ang Pagbabalik. In 2009, he became part of Showtime, a talent search program who was tapped to be the "unevictable" hurado until 2012 when he became the main host of its noontime format. His life story of being bullied as a young, closeted homosexual has also been featured in the drama anthology, Maalaala Mo Kaya.  He was the host of his own Sunday talk show, the top rated Gandang Gabi, Vice!, the show ended in 2020 after 9 years of airing in ABS-CBN. Currently, he is under the management of ABS-CBN, and handling him is business unit head Deo Endrinal after being managed for four years by local entertainment columnist/host Ogie Diaz. In 2016, he became one of the judges of the fifth season of Pilipinas Got Talent alongside Robin Padilla, Angel Locsin, and Freddie M. Garcia.

Viceral starred in minor roles until 2009, where he appeared alongside Vilma Santos and John Lloyd Cruz in the film In My Life. A year later he starred in a remake of the comedy film, Petrang Kabayo, which was an instant hit at its release. The following year, Vice starred in Praybeyt Benjamin with Derek Ramsay, directed by Wenn V. Deramas. The movie became the first local film to reach 300 million pesos in ticket sales, and proved to be an even greater box office success than Petrang Kabayo. He is presently under contract with Viva Films. In 2012, he starred in the Filipino comedy film This Guy's In Love With U Mare! under Star Cinema and Viva Films, alongside Luis Manzano and Toni Gonzaga, directed by Wenn V. Deramas.
He had a cameo in the film Bromance: My Brother's Romance in 2013. He made another movie called Girl, Boy, Bakla, Tomboy. In 2014, Star Cinema released a movie called The Amazing Praybeyt Benjamin an official entry for the MMFF 2014. He participated alongside actress Alex Gonzaga, and actors Richard Yap and James "Bimby" Aquino-Yap. The film was directed by Wenn V. Deramas. In 2015, Star Cinema released Beauty and the Bestie, an official entry for the MMFF 2015. He participated alongside actor Coco Martin, Kapamilya loveteam James Reid and Nadine Lustre or shortly called as JaDine, actors Marco Masa and Alonzo Muhlach, and comedians MC Calaquian and Lassy Marquez. The film was directed by Wenn V. Deramas. He is the first person in the history of Philippine cinema to receive the award Phenomenal Box-Office Star for five consecutive years.

In 2016, his movie, The Super Parental Guardians got rejected to the MMFF 2016; prior to the rejection, it was shown in theaters earlier than people expected. It was released on November 30, 2016 and has grossed P75 Million on their first day, making it the Highest First Day Gross in PH Cinema history surpassing My Bebe Love. This also marks as his non-MMFF film after 4 years since Sisterakas in 2012.

Film

Television

References

Philippine filmographies
Male actor filmographies